Brock Michael Boeser (born February 25, 1997) is an American professional ice hockey player for the Vancouver Canucks of the National Hockey League (NHL).

A top prospect with the Waterloo Black Hawks of the United States Hockey League (USHL), Boeser was selected 23rd overall in the 2015 NHL Entry Draft by the Canucks and spent the following two seasons with the University of North Dakota. He made his NHL debut in 2017 with Vancouver. Internationally, Boeser has played for the United States national junior team at the 2016 World Junior Championships, where he helped the team win a bronze medal. His nickname on the Canucks is "The Flow".

Playing career

Amateur
While playing ice hockey at Burnsville High School, Boeser was drafted first overall by the Sioux City Musketeers in the United States Hockey League (USHL). However, he was later traded to the Waterloo Black Hawks in exchange for Cooper Watson. In his first season with the Black Hawks, the 2014–15 season, Boeser led the league with 35 goals and was named to both the 2014–15 USHL All-Rookie Team and First All-Star Team. In 2015 Boeser was picked to represent Team USA in the IIHF under-20 championships, as the team took bronze overall. During the 2015–16 season Brock started playing college hockey for the University of North Dakota. As a freshman, he led his team to win the NCAA Division I National Championship. Boeser also finished the season as 3rd best in the nation for scoring with 60 points and was named a First Team All-American. Brock declined leaving early for the NHL just yet however and opted to return to North Dakota for another season. He finished his sophomore year with 34 points and missed part of the 2016–17 season while sidelined with a wrist injury. Boeser then decided to make the jump for the NHL after North Dakota was eliminated in the NCAA tournament.

Professional

Boeser was selected 23rd overall by the Vancouver Canucks in the 2015 NHL Entry Draft. He signed a three-year entry-level contract with the Canucks on March 25, 2017. Later that same day, he made his NHL debut in his home state of Minnesota and scored his first NHL goal in the 4–2 win.

On November 4, 2017, Boeser scored a hat trick, the first Canucks player age 20 or younger to do so since Trevor Linden on December 20, 1990 as well as the third youngest behind Trevor Linden and Tony Tanti. All three goals came against Matt Murray of the Pittsburgh Penguins, allowing the Canucks to win 4–2.

Boeser was named the league's Rookie of the Month for November after leading all skaters (not just rookies) with 11 goals in 15 games. He was again named Rookie of the Month for the month of December after scoring 8 goals and 13 points in 13 games. On January 10, 2018, Boeser was named to his first career NHL All-Star Game as a member of the Pacific Division roster. With two goals and an assist in two games, Boeser was named the Most Valuable Player of the 2018 NHL All-Star Game becoming the first rookie to do so since Mario Lemieux in 1985. Boeser also won the 2018 accuracy shooting contest, hitting all five targets in a time of 11.136 seconds. Boeser was injured in a game against the New York Islanders on March 5, 2018, when he collided with Cal Clutterbuck and the Canucks bench. It was later reported he suffered a back injury and would miss 4–6 weeks to recover. At the time of his injury, he led the team in goals, points, shots on goal, and power-play points. Despite missing the final 16 games of the season, Boeser was named a finalist for the Calder Memorial Trophy which is awarded to the league's best rookie of the year. The award was ultimately won by New York Islanders centre Mathew Barzal.

Boeser recovered from his injury enough to join the Canucks for the 2018–19 season. He played 13 games and collected 11 points, despite injuring his groin in a game against the Winnipeg Jets on October 18. After missing two games in November due to his groin injury, Boeser was sent back to Vancouver to be examined by a specialist while the team was on a road trip. After being assigned to the injury reserve for 11 games, Boeser was assigned back to the roster on November 27. On December 9, Boeser scored his second career hat-trick, doing so in a 6–1 win over the St. Louis Blues.

On September 16, 2019, following the expiry of his entry-level contract after the previous season, Boeser signed a three-year, $17.625 million contract to remain with Vancouver. On October 30, in a 5–3 victory over the Los Angeles Kings, Boeser scored his third career hat-trick. However, his season was cut short in February due to a rib injury that was expected to take him eight weeks to recover. Boeser would return from his injury for the final game of the Canucks regular season on March 10, 2020 against the New York Islanders. In the playoffs that followed, Boeser would record 4 goals and 11 points in 17 games, with his first playoff goal going against his hometown Minnesota Wild, as the Canucks made it within a win of the Western Conference Final.

International play

Boeser has played with the United States national junior team, first at the 2014 Ivan Hlinka Memorial Tournament and later with the U.S. Junior Select Team at the 2014 World Junior A Challenge.

His first International Ice Hockey Federation (IIHF)-sanctioned tournament was the 2016 World Junior Championships, where he had three points in seven games as the United States won the bronze medal. He missed the 2017 World Junior Championships due to a wrist injury.

Personal life
Boeser, who grew up in Burnsville, Minnesota, is the youngest of three children to Duke and Laurie Boeser; he has a half brother, Paul, and sister, Jessica who has a Developmental disability. Duke was diagnosed with Parkinson's disease in 2010; he would also have a severe brain injury from a car accident a few years later, forcing him to stop working. To help support the family Laurie worked up to three jobs, including serving in a restaurant, office administration, and preparing tax returns. In early August 2014, while Boeser was in Slovakia for the Ivan Hlinka Memorial Tournament, a tragic car accident south of Minneapolis-St. Paul killed one of his closest friends and severely injured another, both fellow students and athletes at Burnsville High School. This followed the death of his grandfather prior to his first game in the USHL.

His father, Duke passed on May 26, 2022.

Career statistics

Regular season and playoffs

International

Awards and honors

References

External links
 

1997 births
Living people
AHCA Division I men's ice hockey All-Americans
American expatriate ice hockey players in Canada
American men's ice hockey right wingers
Ice hockey players from Minnesota
National Hockey League All-Stars
National Hockey League first-round draft picks
North Dakota Fighting Hawks men's ice hockey players
People from Burnsville, Minnesota
Sioux City Musketeers players
Vancouver Canucks draft picks
Vancouver Canucks players
Waterloo Black Hawks players